Jamie Cachia (born 7 September 1987) is a Scottish field hockey goalkeeper who plays for the Scotland men's national field hockey team.  He plays his club hockey for Beeston Hockey Club in the Men's England Hockey League Premier Division.  From 2011-2014 Cachia played for Sheffield Hockey Club.

Cachia was educated at Craigclowan Preparatory School, Strathallan School and Durham University.  He was first called into the Scotland squad whilst studying at Durham University in 2009.

He was a member of the Scotland squad that finished in ninth place at the 2010 Commonwealth Games.  Cachia was also a member of the Scotland squad that played in the 2011 EuroHockey Nations Championship II in Ukraine and the 2013 EuroHockey Nations Championship II in Austria.

On 12 June 2014 Cachia was selected as a member of Team Scotland for the Glasgow 2014 Commonwealth Games.

References

1987 births
Living people
People educated at Strathallan School
Scottish male field hockey players
Field hockey players at the 2010 Commonwealth Games
Field hockey players at the 2014 Commonwealth Games
People educated at Craigclowan Preparatory School
Beeston Hockey Club players
Men's England Hockey League players
Alumni of St Mary's College, Durham
Commonwealth Games competitors for Scotland